The 1959 NCAA University Division baseball tournament was played at the end of the 1959 NCAA University Division baseball season to determine the national champion of college baseball.  The tournament concluded with eight teams competing in the College World Series, a double-elimination tournament in its thirteenth year.  Eight regional districts sent representatives to the College World Series with preliminary rounds within each district serving to determine each representative.  These events would later become known as regionals.  Each district had its own format for selecting teams, resulting in 22 teams participating in the tournament at the conclusion of their regular season, and in some cases, after a conference tournament.  The College World Series was held in Omaha, NE from June 12 to June 18.  The thirteenth tournament's champion was Oklahoma State, coached by Toby Greene.  The Most Outstanding Player was Jim Dobson of Oklahoma State.

Tournament
The official NCAA record book does not list any participants for District 1 as Connecticut was an automatic qualifier for the 1959 College World Series.

District 1
Connecticut (automatic qualifier)

District 2
Games played at University Park, Pennsylvania.

District 3
Games played at Gastonia, North Carolina.

District 4
Games played at Notre Dame, Indiana.

District 5
Games played at Peoria, Illinois.

District 6
Games played at Bryan, Texas.

District 7
Games played at Greeley, Colorado.

District 8
Games played at Fresno, California.

College World Series

Participants

Bracket and results

1959 College World Series bracket

Game results

All-Tournament Team
The following players were members of the All-Tournament Team.

Quick facts
 In 1996, coach Rod Dedeaux of Southern California was named to the College World Series All-Time Team (1947–95) by the Omaha World-Herald as part of the 50th CWS celebration.
 In 1971, Ron Fairly (OF) of Southern California was named to the College World Series All-Time Team (1947–70) by the blue-ribbon committee chaired by Abe Chanin as part of the 25th CWS celebration.
 In 1996, Alan Hall (C) of Arizona and Charles Shoemaker (SS) of Arizona were named to the 1940s–50s All-Decade Team by a panel of 60 voters representing CWS head coaches, media, and chairs of the Division I Baseball Committee.
 Fresno State's team included Augie Garrido, who went on to win five CWS titles as a coach at Cal State Fullerton and Texas.
 Dave Baldwin of Arizona pitched a two-hitter in a 5–1 victory over Fresno State.
 33,607 fans watched the CWS (10 sessions).
 The championship game was umpired by Bob Stewart, Jack Tobin, Don Carrothers, and Ed Sudol.
 The following records were set or tied:
 Most Balks, Individual, Single Game – 2, Frank Carbajal, Colorado State, vs Clemson, L 7–1, tied (2 others)
 Most Passed Balls, Individual, Single Game – 3, Jim Garrett, Fresno St, vs Arizona, L 5–1, tied (2 others)
 Most Balks, Team, Single Game – 2, Colorado State, vs Clemson, L 7–1, tied (4 others)
 Most Passed Balls, Team, Single Game – 5, Fresno St, vs Arizona, L 5–1
 Most Passed Balls, Both Teams, Single Game – 5, Fresno St (5) vs Arizona (0), Arizona 5–1
 Most Balks, Individual, CWS – 2, Frank Carbajal, 1 game, tied (6 others)
 Most Sacrifice Bunts, Both Teams, Championship Game – 5, Oklahoma St (3) vs Arizona (2), Oklahoma St 5–3
Most Runs by Team, Clemson- 24

Notes

See also
 1959 NCAA College Division baseball tournament
 1959 NAIA World Series

References

NCAA Division I Baseball Championship
Tournament